XML Script and XML-Script are two unrelated XML technologies.  The former (XML Script) is an XML transformation language, while the latter (XML-Script) is a Microsoft technology preview for scripting web browsers - think of it as an XML version of ECMA JavaScript.  Microsoft is expected to rename their XML-Script as Atlas Script before first release.

External links
 XML Script home page
 Microsoft AJAX Library home page

XML-based standards